Mount Ethelwulf is a mainly ice-covered mountain,  high, standing between Mount Egbert and Mount Ethelred at the head of Tumble Glacier, in the Douglas Range of northeast Alexander Island, Antarctica. The mountain was probably first observed by Lincoln Ellsworth, who photographed the east side of the Douglas Range from the air on November 23, 1935; its east face was roughly surveyed in 1936 by the British Graham Land Expedition under John Rymill. It was resurveyed in 1948 by the Falkland Islands Dependencies Survey (FIDS) and named for Ethelwulf, Saxon King of England, 839–858. The west face of the mountain was mapped from air photos taken by the Ronne Antarctic Research Expedition, 1947–48, by D. Searle of the FIDS in 1960. Mount Ethelwulf is the fourth highest peak of Alexander Island, succeeded by Mount Paris and proceeded by Mount Huckle.

See also
 Mount Athelstan
 Mount Bayonne
 Mount Cupola

References 

Mountains of Alexander Island